"Flieger" (English: ″Aircraft″) is a song by German recording artist Helene Fischer. It was written by German singer-songwriter Kristina Bach and Swedish musician Figge Boström for her self-titled eighth studio album (2017), with production overseen by Andreas Herbig and Patrick Salmy along with co-producer Ricardo Munoz. An uplifting dance pop with heavy schlager elements, the song is built around a synthesizer instrumentation and piano riffs. Lyrically, it has its narrator comparing her feelings towards her lover with an aircraft flight.

The song was released as the fourth single from Helene Fischer on 16 March 2018 and became the album's highest-charting single in Switzerland, where it peaked at number 12 on the Swiss Singles Chart. In Germany, the song reached number 19 on the German Singles Chart, becoming Fischer's fifth top 20 entry. German DJ Jay Frog was consulted to produce additional remixes of the song, which appeared on a digital extended play.

Track listings

Charts

References 

2017 songs
2018 singles
Helene Fischer songs
Schlager songs
German-language songs
Polydor Records singles
Songs written by Figge Boström
Songs written by Kristina Bach